Mordellistena subdiscoidalis is a species of beetle in the genus Mordellistena of the family Mordellidae. It was described by Chobaut in 1924.

References

External links
Coleoptera. BugGuide.

Beetles described in 1924
subdiscoidalis